Lammers Glacier is a large glacier flowing east along the north side of Godfrey Upland into the Traffic Circle and Mercator Ice Piedmont, on the east coast of Graham Land, Antarctica. This glacier appears indistinctly in an aerial photograph taken by Sir Hubert Wilkins on 20 December 1928, but shows more clearly in aerial photographs taken by Lincoln Ellsworth in 1935 and the United States Antarctic Service in 1940. It was resighted in 1947 by the Ronne Antarctic Research Expedition under Finn Ronne, who named it for Lester Lammers, who had contributed nine grown husky dogs and four puppies to the expedition.

References

Glaciers of Graham Land
Bowman Coast